Events from the year 1964 in South Korea.

Incumbents
President: Park Chung-hee 
Prime Minister: Choi Tu-son (until 10 May), Chung Il-kwon (starting 10 May)

Events

Births
 22 January – Kim Kwang-seok, singer (d. 1996)
 5 February - Ha Seung-moo, poet, pastor and historical theologian
 13 May - Bae Jong-ok.
 10 July – Eom Yeong-seop, cyclist
 9 December - Hyeon Taeghwan.
 Undated
Chung Hyung-min, biotechnology professor

See also
List of South Korean films of 1964
Years in Japan
Years in North Korea

References

 
South Korea
Years of the 20th century in South Korea
1960s in South Korea
South Korea